Raiders of Tomahawk Creek is a 1950 American Western film directed by Fred F. Sears and written by Barry Shipman. The film stars Charles Starrett, Smiley Burnette, Edgar Dearing, Kay Buckley, Billy Kimbley and Paul Marion. The film was released on October 1, 1950, by Columbia Pictures.

Plot

Cast          
Charles Starrett as Steve Blake / The Durango Kid
Smiley Burnette as Smiley
Edgar Dearing as Randolph Dike
Kay Buckley as Janet Clayton
Billy Kimbley as Billy Calhoun
Paul Marion as Chief Flying Arrow
Paul McGuire as Sheriff
Bill Hale as Jeff Calhoun
Lee Morgan as Saunders

References

External links
 

1950 films
American Western (genre) films
1950 Western (genre) films
Columbia Pictures films
Films directed by Fred F. Sears
American black-and-white films
1950s English-language films
1950s American films